Joan Blanquer i Panadès (1912 in Castellar del Vallès, Spain – 2002 in Sabadell, Spain) was an administrative officer by trade and a filmmaker, scriptwriter, and Catalan teacher. He published several award-winning scripts for amateur films in the magazine Otro cine, published in Barcelona. He worked for the advancement of Catalan in multiple activities at cultural institutions: staged readings of contemporary plays, lectures, research into the lives of local historical characters, Catalan courses, and so on.

References

1912 births
Film directors from Catalonia
Spanish male screenwriters
Catalan-language film directors
2002 deaths
20th-century Spanish screenwriters
20th-century Spanish male writers
Teachers of Catalan